Gordon O'Brien (born 1966) is a Canadian guitarist.

O'Brien won first prize at the prestigious John Williams International Competition in Darwin, Australia, as well as the $10,000 grand prize in the first Stotsenberg Guitar Competition in Los Angeles. In 1994, he received a full Canada Council artist grant to study with the Cuban guitarist/composer Leo Brouwer in Córdoba, Spain.

Gordon O'Brien began studying the guitar with Eli Kassner at the age of eight. At age eleven, O'Brien played with the Toronto Symphony Orchestra at Massey Hall under conductor Andrew Davis. That same year he performed at "Guitar 78". He has since performend in the United States, France, England, Australia, New Zealand, China and Martinique. O'Brien lives in Bewdley, Ontario.

In addition to classical guitar, O'Brien writes and produces songs for a wide range of genres in both Canada and the United States.

External links
Guitar Society of Toronto Biography

1966 births
Canadian classical guitarists
Canadian male guitarists
Living people